People's Power Party may refer to:

 People's Power Party (Malaysia)
 People's Power Party (Singapore)
 People's Power Party (Thailand)
 People's Power Party (Ukraine)

Also:
 Lakas ng Bayan (People's Power), (Philippines)
PDP–Laban (Partido Demokratiko Pilipino-Lakas ng Bayan) (Philippine Democratic Party–People's Power)
 Lok Janshakti Party (lit. "People’s Manpower Party") (India)
 People's Political Power Party of Canada
 People's Power Action Party (Solomon Islands)
 United Democratic Sabah People's Power Party (Malaysia)

See also
 People Power Party (disambiguation)